Antonio Herrera Toro (16 January 1857 – 26 June 1914) was a Venezuelan painter, art critic and professor.

Biography 

He was born in Valencia, Carabobo, and began his artistic studies in 1869, under the tutelage of Martín Tovar y Tovar.

In 1875, he received a government scholarship that allowed him to study in Paris and Rome. He returned in 1881, with sketches of the Assumption of the Virgin, commissioned by José Antonio Ponte (1832–1883), the Archbishop of Caracas, that he used for murals at Caracas Cathedral, painted with the assistance of Cristóbal Rojas. In 1883, he portrayed the final moments of Simón Bolívar, to commemorate the centennial of Bolívar's birth. The following year, he travelled to Peru on behalf of Tovar, making sketches at the sites of the battles of Junín and Ayacucho for paintings that Tovar had been commissioned to create for the Palacio Federal Legislativo. As it turned out, Herrera had to complete the Battle of Ayacucho after Tovar's death.

He later took up journalistic pursuits in addition to painting, signing his writings with the pseudonym "Santoro". He was a major contributor to the cultural affairs bi-weekly,  (The Illustrated Cripple, named by one of its founders, who had a bad leg), and a co-founder of El Granuja (The Rogue).

In 1892, he was appointed Director of the government "Office of Buildings and Ornamentation" (Edificios y Ornato de Poblaciones) and, in 1908, became Director of the Art Academy, following the death of Emilio Jacinto Mauri. Early the following year, he was faced with a strike by a large group of students who were demanding changes in the curriculum. Two years later, together with Pedro Arismendi Brito (1832–1914), a former general and respected man of letters, he drafted regulations for the "Instituto Nacional de Bellas Artes", which included music and acting as well as painting and sculpture. He also tendered his resignation, which was not accepted so, despite being the target of student protests, he retained the position until his death in Caracas.

Selected paintings

Antonio

Further reading 
 Antonio Herrera Toro, 1857-1914: Final de un Siglo: Galería de Arte Nacional, Caracas, Diciembre 1995 – Febrero 1996, (exhibition catalog), La Galería, 1995 
Rafael Sánchez Guerra, Antonio Herrera Toro, 1857–1914: pintor Valenciano, Consejo Municipal del Distrito Valencia, 1965

External links 

Obras de Antonio Herrera Toro son expuestas en la Galería de Arte Nacional, en Caracas, Gaceta Oficial, from Venezolana de Televisión
Biography @ Wikihistoria del Arte Venezolano.

1857 births
1914 deaths
People from Valencia, Venezuela
History painters
Portrait painters
19th-century Venezuelan painters
19th-century male artists
20th-century Venezuelan painters
20th-century Venezuelan male artists
Male painters
Death in Caracas